Peter Anderson may refer to:

Sportspeople
Peter Anderson (cricketer, born 1933), Australian cricketer
Peter Anderson (cricketer, born 1961), Australian cricketer
Peter Anderson (cricketer, born 1968), Australian cricketer
Peter Anderson (New Zealand cricketer) (1950–2012), New Zealand cricketer
Peter Anderson (footballer, born 1932), English former professional footballer for Plymouth Argyle and Torquay United
Peter Anderson (footballer, born 1949), former English footballer and football manager
Pete D. Anderson (1931–2013), horse trainer
Peter Anderson (American football) (born 1963), American football player
P. C. Anderson (1871–1955), educator and golfer in Western Australia

Politicians
Peter C. Anderson, Wisconsin politician
Peter Anderson (politician) (born 1947), Australian politician

Others
Peter Anderson (artist) (1901–1984), American ceramist
Peter Anderson (cinematographer) (born 1942), cinematographer and visual effects supervisor
Peter Anderson (soldier) (1847–1907), Medal of Honor recipient
Pete Anderson (born 1948), music producer
Peter John Anderson (1853–1926), librarian and philatelist
Peter Maltitz Anderson (1879–1954), South African mining engineer
Peter Anderson (playwright) (born 1950), Canadian-American playwright and actor
Peter Anderson (abolitionist) (1822–1879), African American rights activist

See also
Peter Andersson (disambiguation)
Peter Andersen (disambiguation)